Natya Yoga may refer to:

 Bharata Natyam, classical dance form in India
 Natya Yoga, dance yoga practiced in Classical Indian musical theatre
 Natya Yoga, first practiced by Narada, a divine sage from the Vaisnava tradition of Hinduism